Marie of Württemberg (Antoinette Friederike Auguste Marie Anna Herzogin von Württemberg; 17 September 1799 – 24 September 1860) was a daughter of Duke Alexander of Württemberg and Antoinette of Saxe-Coburg-Saalfeld. She was Duchess of Saxe-Coburg and Gotha from 1832 to 1844 as the second wife of Duke Ernest I. As such, she was the stepmother of Prince Albert, consort of Queen Victoria.

Early life
Marie was born on 17 September 1799, the eldest child of Duke Alexander of Württemberg and his wife Princess Antoinette of Saxe-Coburg-Saalfeld. She had two younger surviving brothers, Duke Alexander and Duke Ernest. The Kingdom of Württemberg, as it was known from 1806 onward, was a prominent entity in Germany on the level of Prussia, Bavaria, and Saxony, with connections to the English and Russian royal families.

Marie was raised at Schloss Fantaisie in Bayreuth. As her father was a general in the Russian army, and later governor of Belarus, Marie lived from 1802 to 1832 at Jelgava (modern day Latvia) and in a St. Petersburg palace.

Marriage
In Coburg on 23 December 1832, Marie became the second wife of 48-year-old Ernest I, Duke of Saxe-Coburg and Gotha. Ernest had been eager to find a new bride after the death of his first, estranged wife, Louise of Saxe-Gotha-Altenburg. While Ernest initially sought a wife of high status, he found that his age and poor reputation limited his choices. He settled for Marie, who was thirty-three years old and his niece – uncle-niece relationships were by this time becoming discouraged among European royalty, and Marie was the daughter of Ernest's sister Antoinette.

As a result of this union, Marie became stepmother of Ernest II and Prince Albert, future husband of Queen Victoria of the United Kingdom. Marie was also their first-cousin. Ernest and his sons met Marie at Thalwitz Castle and accompanied her to the duchies to begin her marriage. She would maintain a happy relationship until death with both of her stepsons, becoming godmother (in absentia) of Victoria and Albert's first son, Albert Edward, Prince of Wales, (King Edward VII) in 1841.

Historian Gillian Gill describes Marie as a "severe and melancholy lady". Marie and Ernest would have no children, and the two quickly grew apart, largely living on separate estates. By 1843 Marie had adopted a child of "humble parentage", though Albert cautioned her to avoid giving it hopeless aspirations to rank. He wrote, "I wish you more success than generally attends the education of poor children of the lower ranks by persons of our own."

While Albert referred to her as "dear mama" in his letters to her, Marie opted not to attend several important events in her stepsons' lives, such as their confirmation and Queen Victoria's coronation (Marie cited inclement weather for the former). Albert and Marie maintained correspondence throughout their lives, which has helped historians gain a better understanding of their relationship.

Marie was interested in literature, music, theatre, and art. The newly built Landestheater Coburg was opened on her 41st birthday. From 1842, Franz Liszt often visited her. In 1836, she assumed the management of the Gothaer Marien-Institut, a private educational institution for girls. On May 3, 1842, she donated 2000 thalers for establishing an refuge for young children in Coburg, modeled on a similar institute in the capital, Gotha. The "Marienschulstiftung" (Marie School Foundation) began operation that same year and has run a Kindergarten since, later also a "Kinderkrippe" (for smaller children), as an independent foundation. The institution has been housed since 1869 in a building that Marie owned, "Park 1", in Coburg.

Widowhood
Ernest I died in 1844, and the dowager duchess chose as her dower residence Schloss Reinhardsbrunn, Schloss Friedrichsthal, and Schloss Friedenstein, all in Gotha. She opted to return to Coburg mainly to meet with her visiting English relatives. Marie died at Schloss Friedenstein on 24 September 1860, the year before Albert's death.

Ancestry

References

Notes

Works cited

 Bachmann, Gertraude (1999). Herzogin Marie von Sachsen-Coburg und Gotha, geborene Herzogin von Württemberg 1799 - 1860. Band 14 der Schriftenreihe der historischen Gesellschaft Coburg e.V., Coburg
 
 
 
 Sandner, Harald (2001). Das Haus Sachsen-Coburg und Gotha 1826 bis 2001. Eine Dokumentation zum 175-jährigen Jubiläum des Stammhauses in Wort und Bild. Druck- und Verlagsanstalt Neue Presse, Coburg, S.
 
 

1799 births
1860 deaths
Duchesses of Württemberg
Princesses of Saxe-Coburg and Gotha
Duchesses of Saxe-Coburg and Gotha
People from Coburg
Burials at the Ducal Family Mausoleum, Glockenburg Cemetery, Coburg